The Brave Ones is a 1916 American silent comedy film featuring Oliver Hardy.

Plot
After they are caught stealing food, the sheriff (Billy Bletcher) sentences Plump (Oliver Hardy) and Runt (Billy Ruge) to spend the night in a haunted house.  They are not alone, though, as the house is actually a hideout for a gang of counterfeiters.

Cast
 Oliver Hardy - Plump (as Babe Hardy)
 Billy Ruge - Runt
 Billy Bletcher - The Sheriff
 Elsie MacLeod - The Sheriff's daughter (as Elsie McLeod)

See also
 List of American films of 1916
 Oliver Hardy filmography

References

External links

1916 films
American black-and-white films
1916 comedy films
American silent short films
1916 short films
Silent American comedy films
American comedy short films
1910s American films